Explodemon! is a 2D platform video game developed by Curve Studios for the PlayStation 3. It was released on the PlayStation Network in 2011. The game is also available on Microsoft Windows via GamersGate.

Overview
Players control the titular hero, Explodemon, a superhero that uses his ability to blow himself up in order to destroy enemies and objects, propel himself through the air and solve environmental puzzles.

The developers have described the game as "a loving parody of badly translated action games and everything that they embody".

Development
Design director Jonathan Biddle, who created the original Explodemon! prototype in November 2005 in his spare time, describes the game as "what Treasure would create if they mixed Yoshi’s Island with Half-Life 2, and is inspired by elements from games as diverse as Street Fighter II, Halo, Super Metroid and Bangai-O".

Reception

The PlayStation 3 version received "mixed" reviews according to the review aggregation website Metacritic.

References

External links
 Official website
 

Platform games
Side-scrolling video games
Superhero video games
Video games developed in the United Kingdom
Video games with 2.5D graphics
2011 video games
PlayStation 3 games
PlayStation Network games
Windows games
Indie video games
Cancelled PlayStation Portable games
Cancelled Wii games
Curve Games games
Single-player video games